In logistics, a counting point (CP; also known as a status point, data acquisition point, check point, or control point) is a certain spot designated for planning, controlling, and monitoring material flow items (e.g. single parts, assembly groups, final products, bins, racks, containers, and freight carriers).

Installation 
If the production and material flow gets more and more complex then more counting points must be installed in the process of transport, shipping, and manufacturing. Especially check points for quality control and quality assurance can be used outstandingly as counting points but also data acquisition points in material handling processes. For better planning and monitoring of material flow items it is helpful to order all counting points in such a way that the requirements of an ideal Boolean Interval (mathematics) Algebra can be fulfilled. Boolean intervals are half-opened and a counting point lays always inside at the beginning and the ending lays outside and is the entry-point of the next-following interval. Such an interval can represent any kind of stretch in production and material flow e.g. an assembly line, a storage or warehouse, a transport route etc. Alternative production and transportation stretches are mapped as parallel intervals, which are logical equivalent but have their own different data acquisition points. If a flow item passes a certain CP it has left the preceding interval and stays in the concerned interval at the same time. By this it can be assured that a flow object can stay only in one interval at a certain moment which is also true and evident for parallel intervals. This kind of mapping material flow structure is necessary for a consistent calculation of the lead-time and complete cycle time for flow items which is extremely important not only for material flow planning but also for production planning and manufacturing operations management in general.

Usage 
Counting points are used in different logistic areas like transportation, material handling, goods receipt, and goods issue at the border of a plant, because this is often transfer of ownership. Other well-known counting points are receiving and issuing material items at the border of a storage or warehouse. Counting points play an important rule also in manufacturing and production scheduling and different concepts of material requirements planning (e.g for the concept of cumulative quantities and the gross-net-method. Counting points also appear in the automotive industry where the production flow of a car is controlled, scheduled, and monitored continuously at exactly-defined check points for different manufacturing departments and shops and where the data is used for scheduling and optimization.

See also 
 Supply Chain Management
 Cargo
 Material Requirement Planning
 Enterprise Resource Planning
 Operations Management
 Production Planning
 Data acquisition

References

External links 
 SAP-HELP

Literature 
 
 
 
 

Logistics